The 1990 Tour de France started with 198 cyclists, divided into 22 teams of 9 cyclists: Sixteen teams qualified based on the FICP team ranking, while six teams were given wildcards.

Teams

Qualified teams

 
 
 
 
 
 
 
 
 
 
 
 
 
 
 
 

Invited teams

Cyclists

By starting number

By team

By nationality
The 198 riders that competed in the 1990 Tour de France represented 19 different countries. Riders from eight countries won stages during the race; riders from Italy and Netherlands equally won the largest number of stages.

Notes

References

1990 Tour de France
1990